

Events 

Death of Bernard Germain de Lacépède
Charles Lucien Bonaparte updates Wilson's American Ornithology as American ornithology, or, The natural history of birds inhabiting the United States, not given by Wilson : with figures drawn, engraved, and coloured, from nature. He added more than 100 species.
William Jardine and  Prideaux John Selby commence the serial publication Illustrations of Ornithology (1825–1843).
The Volieren (aviary) for birds of prey opened at Ménagerie du Jardin des Plantes in Paris
Lord Charles Somerset founds the South African Museum
1825–1828 Carl Peter Holbøll becomes Royal Inspector of Colonies and Whaling in South Greenland
Foundation of Bergen Museum.

Expeditions 

1825-28 Circumnavigation by the sloop  H.M.S. "Blossom" under Frederick William Beechey (commander), Edward Belcher (surveyor), Alexander Collie,(surgeon and naturalist), George Tradescant Lay (naturalist)

Ongoing events 

1824-1825 Johann Baptist von Spix  Avium Species Novae Birds first described in this work in 1825 include  the social flycatcher, the spot-winged wood-quail, the black-fronted piping-guan, the blue-crowned manakin, the razor-billed curassow, and the wattled curassow

Birding and ornithology by year
1825 in science